The Free Spirit World Tour is the fourth headlining concert tour by American singer Khalid, in support of his second studio album, Free Spirit (2019). It began on June 20, 2019 in Glendale at Gila River Arena.

Background 
On April 1, 2019, the singer announced he will be going on his first ever arena tour to promote Free Spirit. Dates were first announced in North America, with Clairo was announced as the opening act. On April 8, 2019, dates were announced for Europe and Oceania, with Mabel and RAYE announced as opening acts for Europe.

Set list 
This set list is representative of the concert in Glendale on June 20, 2019. It does not represent all concerts for the duration of the tour.

"Free Spirit"
"8teen"
"Twenty One"
"Hundred"
"Saved"
"My Bad"
"Bad Luck"
"Bluffin'"
"Vertigo"
"Motion"
"Better"
"Right Back"
"Location"
"Silence"
"American Teen"
"Another Sad Love Song"
"Heaven"
"Alive"
"Paradise"
"Self"
"Talk"
"Outta My Head"
"Young Dumb & Broke"
"Eastside"
"Love Lies"
"OTW"
"Intro"
"Keep Me"
"Salem's Interlude"
"Saturday Nights"

Notes
 During the first show in London, Ed Sheeran appeared as a special guest to perform "Beautiful People" with Khalid.

Tour dates

Postponed dates

Notes

References 

2019 concert tours
Concert tours postponed due to the COVID-19 pandemic